The Soviet Union (USSR) competed at the 1976 Winter Olympics in Innsbruck, Austria.

During the games, the Soviet Union won 13 gold medals, the most any country won at a single Winter Olympics. Norway tied this record during the Salt Lake City games, and Canada broke it with 14 when they hosted the Vancouver games.

Medalists

Alpine skiing

Men

Women

Biathlon

Men

Men's 4 x 7.5 km relay

Cross-country skiing

Men

Men's 4 × 10 km relay

Women

Women's 4 × 5 km relay

Figure skating

Men

Women

Pairs

Ice Dancing

Ice hockey

First round
Winners (in bold) entered the Medal Round. Other teams played a consolation round for 7th-12th places.

|}

Medal round

USSR 6-2 USA
USSR 16-1 Poland
USSR 7-3 West Germany
USSR 7-2 Finland
USSR 4-3 Czechoslovakia

Luge

Men

(Men's) Doubles

Women

Nordic combined 

Events:
 normal hill ski jumping 
 15 km cross-country skiing

Ski jumping

Speed skating

Men

Women

Notes

References
Official Olympic Reports
International Olympic Committee results database
 Olympic Winter Games 1976, full results by sports-reference.com

Nations at the 1976 Winter Olympics
1976
Winter Olympics